Love Will Kill All can refer to the following:
Love Will Kill All (album), an album by American metal band Bleeding Through
Love Will Kill All, an EP by American metalcore band Calico System